Quercus salicina is an oak species found in Japan, South Korea and Taiwan. It is placed in subgenus Cerris, section Cyclobalanopsis.

The larvae of the Japanese oakblue (Arhopala japonica), of Acrocercops vallata and Marumba sperchius feed on Q. salicina.

Stenophyllanin A, a tannin, and other quinic acid gallates can be found in Q. salicina. The triterpene friedelin can also be isolated from the leaves of the tree.

References

External links 

salicina
Plants described in 1910
Trees of Japan
Trees of South Korea
Trees of Taiwan